Map of places in Bedfordshire compiled from this list
See the list of places in England for places in other counties.

This is a list of all the towns and villages in the county of Bedfordshire. See the List of Bedfordshire settlements by population for a list sorted by population.

List of places

A 

 Aley Green
 Ampthill
 Apsley End
 Arlesey
 Aspley Guise
 Aspley Heath
 Astwick

B 

 Barton-le-Clay
 Battlesden
 Beadlow
 Bedford
 Beeston
 Begwary
 Biddenham
 Bidwell
 Biggleswade
 Billington
 Bletsoe
 Blunham
 Bolnhurst
 Bourne End, Bletsoe
 Bourne End, Cranfield
 Box End
 Brickhill
 Brogborough
 Bromham
 Broom
 Budna

C 

 Caddington
 California
 Campton
 Cardington
 Carlton
 Castle
 Cauldwell
 Chalgrave
 Chalton
 Chaul End
 Church End, Arlesey
 Church End, Totternhoe
 Chawston
 Chellington
 Chicksands
 Chiltern Green
 Clapham
 Clifton
 Clipstone
 Clophill
 Cockayne Hatley
 Colesden
 Colmworth
 Cople
 Cotton End
 Cranfield

D 

 De Parys
 Duck's Cross
 Dunstable
 Dunton
 Denton

E 

 East Hyde
 Eastcotts
 Eaton Bray
 Edworth
 Eggington
 Elstow
 Eversholt
 Everton
 Eyeworth

F 

 Fairfield
 Fancott
 Farndish
 Felmersham
 Flitton
 Flitwick

G 

 Goldington
 Gravenhurst
 Great Barford
 Great Billington
 Great Denham
 Greenfield

H 

 Hall End
 Harlington
 Harpur
 Harrold
 Harrowden
 Hatch
 Haynes
 Haynes Church End
 Haynes West End
 Heath and Reach
 Henlow
 Henlow Camp
 Herrings Green
 Higham Gobion
 Hills End
 Hinwick
 Hockliffe
 Hockwell Ring
 Holme
 Holywell
 Honeydon
 Houghton Conquest
 Houghton Regis
 How End
 Hulcote
 Husborne Crawley
 Hyde

I 

 Ickwell
 Ion
 Ireland

J

K 

 Keeley Green
 Kempston
 Kempston Central and East
 Kempston Hardwick
 Kempston North
 Kempston Rural
 Kempston South
 Kempston West
 Kensworth
 Kensworth Lynch
 Keysoe
 Keysoe Row
 Kingsbrook
 Knotting
 Knotting Green

L 

 Langford
 Leagrave
 Leedon
 Leighton Buzzard
 Lidlington
 Limbury
 Linslade
 Little Barford
 Little Billington
 Little Staughton
 Lower Caldecote
 Lower Dean
 Lower Gravenhurst
 Lower Shelton
 Lower Stondon
 Lower Sundon
 Lower Woodside
 Luton

M 

 Marston Moretaine
 Maulden
 Melchbourne
 Meppershall
 Millbrook
 Milton Bryan
 Milton Ernest
 Moggerhanger

N 

 New Mill End
 Newnham
 Northill

O 

 Oakley
 Odell
 Old Warden

P 

 Pavenham
 Pegsdon
 Pepperstock
 Pertenhall
 Podington
 Potsgrove
 Potton
 Pulloxhill
 Putnoe

Q 

 Queens Park

R 

 Radwell
 Ravensden
 Renhold
 Ridgmont
 Riseley
 Roxton

S 

 Salford
 Salph End
 Sandy
 Seddington
 Sewell
 Sharnbrook
 Sharpenhoe
 Sheep Lane
 Shefford
 Shelton
 Shillington
 Shortstown
 Silsoe
 Skimpot
 Slip End
 Souldrop
 Southcote
 Southill
 Stagsden
 Stanbridge
 Stanford
 Steppingley
 Stevington
 Stewartby
 Stotfold
 Streatley
 Studham
 Sutton
 Swineshead

T 

 Tebworth
 Tempsford
 The Hyde
 Thorn
 Thorncote Green
 Thurleigh
 Tilsworth
 Tingrith
 Toddington
 Totternhoe
 Turvey

U 

 Upper Caldecote
 Upper Dean
 Upper Gravenhurst
 Upper Shelton
 Upper Staploe
 Upper Stondon
 Upper Sundon

V

W 

 West End
 Westoning
 Wharley End
 Whipsnade
 Wilden
 Willington
 Wilshamstead
 Wilstead
 Wingfield
 Wixams
 Woburn
 Wood End
 Woodside
 Wootton
 Wootton Green
 Wrestlingworth
 Wyboston
 Wymington

X

Y 

 Yelden

Z

Places of interest 

 
Bedfordshire